Strange Adventures In Infinite Space is a roguelike video game created by the indie developer Digital Eel and released for Windows and Mac on March 15, 2002 by boardgame developer-publisher, Cheapass Games. Releases for Pocket PC and Palm by British developer-publisher Astraware followed. In 2020, the game was updated to run on current computer operating systems of the day. It remains free to download and share.

Strange Adventures is considered one of the first rogue-lite games, a hybrid of roguelikes and other types of games.

Gameplay 
In Strange Adventures In Infinite Space the game players explore a "plausibly implausible" fictional region of the Milky Way galaxy called The Purple Void.

The game is non-linear, with turn-based movement and real-time combat.

Strange Adventures In Infinite Space sets itself up differently each time it is played. Stars, black holes, planets, nebulae, artifacts, alien patrols, gadgets, lifeforms and dozens of events and encounters are randomized for each game session. Unlike conventional roguelikes, Strange Adventures In Infinite Space features graphics, music and sound, and game sessions typically last from 3 to 20 minutes, hence the game's tagline "Explore the galaxy in 20 minutes or less!"

Development 
Strange Adventures In Infinite Space was created by Digital Eel, a studio that included Richard Carlson, Iikka Keranen, and Bill Sears (creating under the name Phosphorous). The team had previously made a game called Plasmaworm, after abandoning six months of work on 4X space game. As they began work on Strange Adventures In Infinite Space, they wanted to make roguelike game with a randomized world, similar to board games such as Source of the Nile, Tales of the Arabian Nights, and Voyage of the BSM Pandora. The studio realized they could re-use some of the assets from their previously abandoned space game, with the goal of creating a space opera experience that could be completed in less than 20 minutes. In addition to inspiration from board games, the studio was inspired Star Trek creator Gene Roddenbury, and Star Control creators Fred Ford and Paul Reiche III.  

With game mechanics and graphics from their old project, the team quickly established the style of the game's ships, combat, and interface. Designer Iikka Keranen was keen to minimize the number of clicks required to complete any action, and the team decided to hide most numbers to keep players immersed in the fictional experience. The team also strived to create a consistent science-fiction universe, with environments, abilities, and technologies based on current scientific theories. Bill Sears was given freedom to create the game's graphics, and its humor and mystery led the game's fiction to follow the artwork.  

Although the game's development had no deadline, it was completed with part-time work from three people over six months, or the equivalent of two full-time months. Designer Rich Carlson credits the team's efficiency to their small size, which also allowed them to listen closely to feedback from testers.

Release 
Strange Adventures In Infinite Space was released on March 15, 2002 by boardgame developer-publisher Cheapass Games.

Sequels
Digital Eel followed Strange Adventures In Infinite Space with a self-funded sequel, working on the game for one and a half years part-time. Designer Rich Carlson described the game as "a hybrid, part strategy game, part adventure game and part starship combat game, similar in some ways to games like Pirates! and Star Control II." Their goal for the game's development was to add features that had previously been left out of their previous game, and to improve the game's depth and graphical quality. Weird Worlds: Return to Infinite Space was released for the PC and iPad in 2005.

By 2013, the crowd-funded Infinite Space III: Sea of Stars was developed using crowdfunding. The game was later released in 2015.

Re-Releases 
On November 11, 2005, the source code became freely available under the GNU GPL, though without the other game content. Since September 28, 2009, Strange Adventures In Infinite Space was made available as freeware, including the game content. Due to the source code availability ports to alternative platforms emerged, for instance for the ARM and Linux based OpenPandora. It was also released for Pocket PC and Palm by British developer/publisher, Astraware. License changed to GPLv3 and assets to CC-BY-NC-4.0 on May 18, 2020.

In 2020, Strange Adventures in Infinite Space was reissued by Digital Eel and Chris Collins with support for contemporary Windows, macOS, and Linux operating systems. Digital Eel opted to make the release for free, and included community mods that were developed to expand the game on its original release.

Reception

Strange Adventures In Infinite Space 
Strange Adventures in Infinite Space received a 77 score on Metacritic, indicating "generally favorable reviews". Computer Games Magazine praised it as a "light but oddly entertaining gaming hors d'oeuvre". Writing for GameSpot, Bruce Geryk felt that "the game's short length is what makes it so engaging." Tom Chick of GameSpy called it "a clever and engaging take on strategy and adventure gaming", while noting that players will see most of the game's content after a dozen play-throughs. Scot Krol of PC Game World recommended the game for providing "more enjoyment in fifteen minutes than most games have in fifteen hours of play [and] a perfect example of what good gameplay means in a game". Ernest Adams, writing for Gamasutra in 2005, described Strange Adventures In Infinite Space as "the perfect short game". Upon the game's free re-release, Kotaku praised it as "an excellent mix of Master Of Orion-lite strategy and Star Control-inspired arcade combat".

Strange Adventures In Infinite Space was a 2003 Independent Games Festival finalist for the Seumas McNally Grand Prize.

Weird Worlds: Return to Infinite Space 
The sequel, Weird Worlds: Return to Infinite Space, has received a 79 score on Metacritic, indicating "generally favorable reviews". Finnish gaming publication Pelit felt that the game captured the feeling of space exploration, but was in need of more content. GameZilla called it "a worthy sequel to the original excellent title", and recommended the game "for those who miss the simplicity, yet complex nature of the old Star Control titles". Tyler Sager of Gaming Nexus praised the game its short experience of exploration. Computer Games Magazine was critical of the game's randomness and lack of adventure, calling it a "CliffsNotes version of Star Control". Kieron Gillen from Eurogamer praised the game for its "variety, excitement, thought and pace all in tiny bundle you can wolf down in a sandwich break". Writing for Gamasutra, Ernest Adams praised the game for the balance between its different layers.

Weird Worlds won the award for Innovation In Audio at the 2006 Independent Games Festival, and was nominated for the Seumas McNally Grand Prize that same year.

Legacy 
The game has been considered to be one of the first "rogue-lite" games, games that took core roguelike such as permadeath and procedural generation but adopted them to different gameplay styles that forwent the tile-based and hack-and-slash gameplay. Writing for PC Gamer, Jody McGregor called it the "original spaceship roguelike", tracing its lineage from the Star Control series to FTL: Faster than Light. FTL developer Justin Ma has cited Weird Worlds as an influence on the game's development. Journalists have since made favorable comparisons between FTL and Weird Worlds. Rock Paper Shotgun also noted the influence of Weird Worlds on The Long Journey Home, another procedurally generated space game influenced by FTL.

Reviews
Pyramid

See also 
 List of roguelikes
 Weird Worlds: Return to Infinite Space (sequel)

References

External links 
 
 Digital Eel Games homepage: Official site for all "Infinite Space" electronic and table game updates
 TV tropes video games page: Strange Adventures in Infinite Space details and references deep dive

Roguelike video games
Freeware games
2002 video games
MacOS games
Classic Mac OS games
Windows games
Cheapass Games games
Open-source video games
Video games developed in the United States
Commercial video games with freely available source code
Creative Commons-licensed video games
Indie video games
Single-player video games